Alain Berset (born 9 April 1972) is a Swiss politician who has served as a Member of the Swiss Federal Council since 2012. A member of the Social Democratic Party (SP/PS), he heads the Federal Department of Home Affairs since he took office. Berset serves as President of the Swiss Confederation for 2023.

From 1 January 2018 to 31 December 2018, Berset served as President of the Swiss Confederation. At age 45, he was the youngest officeholder since Marcel Pilet-Golaz in 1934. Prior to his election to the Federal Council in 2011, he was a member of the Council of States (from the canton of Fribourg, 2003–2011), where he served as President of the Council of States for the 2008–2009 term. Berset speaks French, German, Italian, Romansh and English.

Biography

Personal life
Born in Fribourg on 9 April 1972, the son of a teacher and a bookseller, Berset studied political science and economics at the University of Neuchâtel, where he received a master's degree in political science in 1996 and a PhD in economics in 2005 with a dissertation about the role of international migration upon local working conditions.

Berset is married to Muriel Zeender Berset and is the father of three children. The family lives in Belfaux, a village near Fribourg.

Early career
Berset worked as assistant lecturer and researcher at the Institute for Regional Economics of the University of Neuchâtel from 1996 till 2000, when he moved to the Hamburg Institute for Economic Research for a year. In 2000 he became a member of the Constituent Assembly of the canton of Fribourg and president of its social democrat parliamentary group until 2004. He also served on the Belfaux communal parliament from 2001 to 2003. In 2002, he became strategic consultant to the Department of Economic Affairs of the canton of Neuchâtel.

Member of the Council of States
In 2003 he was elected to the Swiss Council of States from the canton of Fribourg as a member of the Social Democratic Party becoming the youngest member of the Council of States, as well as the party's parliamentary group's vice president in December 2005. He was also a member of the parliamentary assembly of the Organization for Security and Co-operation in Europe (OSCE). Following his reelection in 2007, he was elected the States Council's vice president in 2007–2008; he subsequently served as the body's president in 2008–2009.

Member of the Federal Council

On 14 December 2011, he was elected to the Swiss Federal Council, the seven-member Swiss federal government, with 126 votes out of 245. He was one of the Social Democratic Party's two candidates (alongside Pierre-Yves Maillard) officially put forward to succeed the head of the Federal Department of Foreign Affairs, Micheline Calmy-Rey, who had announced her resignation from the Federal Council. Berset became head of the Federal Department of Home Affairs as its former head Didier Burkhalter became head of the Federal Department of Foreign Affairs.

On 1 January 2017, Berset became Vice-President of the Federal Council under President Doris Leuthard, whom he succeeded on 1 January 2018. He left the presidency on 31 December 2018. He was succeeded by Ueli Maurer.

During the COVID-19 pandemic in Switzerland, as head of the Federal Department of Home Affairs, he was one of the leading figures in the government's response to the crisis. Following an interview with Berset, Schweizer Radio und Fernsehen (SRF) wrote, "there were moments during the first wave when he no longer knew whether it was day or night, weekday or weekend. He said he had never experienced anything like that before".

On 1 January 2022, Berset became again Vice-President of the Federal Council, under President Ignazio Cassis; on 7 December 2022, he was elected President, succeeding Cassis on 1 January 2023.

Blackmail affair 
On 21 November 2020, the weekly  Die Weltwoche  revealed, from the pen of the former Zürich SVP/UDC national councillor Christoph Mörgeli, that Berset was the victim of an attempted blackmail the previous year. A woman, since convicted in criminal proceedings, allegedly tried to extort 100,000 Swiss francs from him by threatening to publish photographs and private messages that they had exchanged. The political world seized the case; the Supervisory Authority of the Public Ministry of the Confederation (MPC) opened an investigation to verify that the Federal Councillor did not benefit from favours in the treatment of his complaint.

In September 2021, while the health policy followed by the Federal Council to overcome the COVID-19 pandemic was contested and Alain Berset criticized, the case bounced back: a controversy broke out over the use of a vehicle of representation during an escapade with the woman, on the use of state collaborators to settle the attempt of blackmail, in particular by sending the Task Force TIGRIS of the Federal Judicial Police at the home of the person concerned, as well as on the limits between respect for the private life invoked by the magistrate and the public interest.

On 14 June 2022, Berset was cleared in a parliamentary investigation into the alleged abuse of state resources.

Works
Berset is the author of several books and some 30 articles on economic development, migration and regional development.

Notes and references

External links

Official biography in English Federal Department of Home Affairs FDHA

Alain Berset, Speaker of the Council of States 2008/2009 The Federal Assembly - The Swiss Parliament

 Main d'oeuvre étrangère et diversité des compétences, Editions Harmattan, Paris 2000
 Transformation des systèmes locaux d'emploi et compétitivité des régions: le rôle des migrations internationales, thesis for doctorate in economics, Editions Universitaires, Neuchâtel 2005
 Circulation of Competencies and Dynamics of Regional Production Systems”, International Journal of Multicultural Societies, vol.8, no.1, 2006, pp. 61–83, with O. Crevoisier
 Changer d'ère, pour un nouveau contrat gouvernemental, Éditions Favre, Lausanne 2007, with C. Levrat
“Ciel, le Parlement a démantelé mon projet de loi; les aléas de la phase parlementaire”, in Fluckiger A., Guy-Ecabert C, Guider les parlements et les gouvernements pour mieux légiférer, Edition Schulthess, Zürich 2007 pp. 137–145

|-

|-

|-

|-

|-

|-

1972 births
Living people
Members of the Council of States (Switzerland)
Presidents of the Council of States (Switzerland)
Members of the Federal Council (Switzerland)
People from Fribourg
University of Neuchâtel alumni
Social Democratic Party of Switzerland politicians
Blackmail